Levente Szőr (born 14 January 2001) is a Hungarian professional footballer who plays for Kisvárda FC.

Career statistics
.

References

 
 

2001 births
Living people
People from Kisvárda
Hungarian footballers
Association football midfielders
Kisvárda FC players
Nemzeti Bajnokság I players
Sportspeople from Szabolcs-Szatmár-Bereg County
21st-century Hungarian people